Bailu is a town under the administration of Pengzhou, Sichuan, China. , it has one residential community and eight villages under its administration.

Tourist marketing 

Bailu has been developed into a so-called "French town" due to its French Catholic heritage, according to Xianghui Liao, however, the real reason for this designation is to serve tourism and economic development: "This led to the commercialization of once authentic religious sites for tourism and economic development as part of the secularization process. [...] Catholicism's public influence on tourism and economic development has been increasing, while its activities and church attendance have not followed synchronously."

Tourist attractions 
 Annunciation Seminary
 Earthquake Heritage Park

See also 
 Catholic Church in Sichuan
 Marie-Julien Dunand
 List of township-level divisions of Sichuan

References 

Towns in Sichuan
Pengzhou
Catholic Church in Sichuan